Le Blanc is a commune and a subprefecture of the  department of Indre, and the region of Centre-Val de Loire, central France.

Geography
Le Blanc is the main city of the Parc naturel régional de la Brenne, on the banks of the river Creuse.

Population

Facilities
Near Le Blanc, there is a VLF-transmitter of French Navy. It transmits messages on 18.3 kHz and 21.7 kHz to submerged submarines

See also
Saint-Benoît-du-Sault
Communes of the Indre department
Marcel Gaumont. Sculptor of war memorial

References

External links

Communes of Indre
Subprefectures in France
Berry, France